Chinedu Ikedieze, MFR (born 12 December 1977) is a Nigerian actor, entrepreneur and serial investor. He is best known for playing alongside Osita Iheme in majority of the movies after their breakthrough as duo in the 2002 film Aki na Ukwa. He has featured in over 150 films in a career spanning over 20 years. He has acted in the role of a kid in most of his films during his early career due to his stature and physical appearance. He is known as Aki for his performance in the film Aki na Ukwa. In 2011, he married fashion designer Nneoma Nwaijah and the couple had their first child in 2012.

Career 
Chinedu completed his primary and secondary education in Aba, Abia State. After completing his secondary education he earned a Higher National Diploma (HND) in Theatre Arts and a degree in Mass Communication from the Institute of Management and Technology, Enugu (IMT). After completing his studies at IMT, he initially wanted to become a lawyer but pursued a career in film acting in 1998 and initially featured in lesser roles. He first acted in a minor role in the 1998 film Evil Men. He enrolled in the prestigious New York Film Academy in 2004.

Chemistry with Osita Iheme 

He entered the Nollywood industry in 2000 and rose to recognition in a Nigerian Movie he acted in 2000,  Aki na Ukwa,  where he played the breakthrough role of Aki alongside another little person actor Osita Iheme. This created a bond between both of them. The duo were popularly identified as "Aki and Paw Paw" since the release of the film in 2002 and ever since they have both featured together in several films taking the lead roles in those movies. Both Chinedu and Osita have been maintaining onscreen and offscreen chemistry which is widely praised by the Nollywood fraternity.

Honour 
In 2007, Ikedieze received the Lifetime Achievement Award at the African Movie Academy Awards. He was also  honored with the Order of the Federal Republic which was given by the then Nigerian President Goodluck Jonathan for his contributions to Nollywood and to the economic growth of the country.

In 2018, he was honored in Miami, Florida in the United States of America as a distinguished visitor to the city of Miami, Florida. In appreciation he said “From the bottom of my heart I say thank you to Miami-Dade, country office of the Mayor and the county commissioners for honoring me as a distinguished visitor to the city of Miami, Florida. You have just given me a key to more success in life. He therefore encouraged all to believe if themselves if the world believes in them.

Legacy 
His performance alongside fellow little person actor Osita Iheme in the 2002 film Aki na Ukwa is still widely spoken of and the duo especially Osita's character has been trending through memes since 2019 in Twitter and other social media platforms globally. Osita is listed as one of the richest actors in Nigeria.

Filmography

Television
 The Johnsons as Efetobore Johnson, produced by Rogers Ofime

External links

References

Male actors from Abia State
Nigerian male film actors
Igbo male actors
Nigerian male comedians
Living people
1977 births
Actors with dwarfism
21st-century Nigerian male actors
Lifetime Achievement Award Africa Movie Academy Award winners
Members of the Order of the Federal Republic
Actors from Abia State
Nigerian film producers
Nigerian businesspeople
New York Film Academy alumni
Nigerian television actors